William Buchanan Benson (born June 16, 1998) is an American professional baseball outfielder for the Cincinnati Reds of Major League Baseball (MLB). He has previously played in MLB for the Cleveland Guardians.

Career

Cleveland Indians / Guardians
Benson was drafted by the Cleveland Indians in the first round of the 2016 Major League Baseball draft out of The Westminster Schools in Atlanta, Georgia. He was committed to play college baseball for the Duke Blue Devils, but instead chose to sign with the Indians.

Benson made his professional debut with the Rookie-level Arizona League Indians where he posted a .209 batting average with six home runs and 27 runs batted in during 44 games. In 2017, he played for the Mahoning Valley Scrappers of the Class A Short Season New York–Penn League where he batted .238 with ten home runs and 36 runs batted in during 56 games, and in 2018, he played with the Lake County Captains of the Class A South Atlantic League, hitting .180 with 22 home runs and 58 runs batted in during 123 games. He returned to Lake County to begin 2019. On April 18, 2019, he hit four home runs in one game. Benson was promoted to the Lynchburg Hillcats of the Class A-Advanced Carolina League in June after hitting .272 with 18 home runs and 55 runs batted in during 62 games with Lake County. Over 61 games in Lynchburg, he batted .189 with four home runs and 23 runs batted in.

In July 2020, Benson signed on to play for Team Texas of the Constellation Energy League (a makeshift four-team independent league created as a result of the COVID-19 pandemic) for the 2020 season. To begin the 2021 season, he was assigned to the Akron RubberDucks of the Double-A Northeast.

The Guardians selected Benson's contract on August 1, 2022.

Cincinnati Reds
Benson was traded to the Cincinnati Reds on February 8, 2023, in exchange for minor league outfielder Justin Boyd and a player to be named later.

References

External links

1998 births
Living people
African-American baseball players
Akron RubberDucks players
Arizona League Indians players
Baseball players from Atlanta
Cleveland Guardians players
Columbus Clippers players
Lake County Captains players
Lynchburg Hillcats players
Mahoning Valley Scrappers players
Major League Baseball outfielders